Steinar Sønk Nickelsen (born 5 October 1978) is a Norwegian jazz musician (Hammond organ and piano) from Bærum, known from several bands and album releases.

Biography 
Nickelsen was born in Oslo, and became well known in Norway when he was awarded the Young jazz musician of the year award at Moldejazz in 2002, within the band Solid!. In Oslo he played in a trio with Pål Thowsen and Jon Eberson releasing the album (2002).After this he attended the jazz program at Trondheim Musikkonservatorium, joined the Trondheim Jazz Orchestra and recorded with Pat Metheny. He then studied at the Norwegian Academy of Music in Oslo, IACP in Paris and got his church music education in Trondheim.

Moreover, he collaborated in the band Jupiter with Håvard Stubø and Magnus Forsberg who released several albums. In Peloton he played with the guitarist Petter Vågan, the drummer Erik Nylander, saxophonist Hallvard Godal and trumpeter Karl Strømme. He also was smaller ensembles led by Jacob Holm and Mats Thorsen. He moved to Copenhagen (2004) for studies at the Rhythm Conservatory, where he led the Nickelsen Trio with drummer Ari Hoenig and guitarist Lage Lund at the time. He also figures on the New York City music scene, and recently played in the trio Excess Luggage with pianist Vigleik Storaas and drummer Håkon Mjåset Johansen releasing the album Excess Luggage (2007) and Hand Luggage Only (2011), as well as in a trio with the guitarist Nils-Olav Johansen and drummer Truls Rønning.

Nickelsen now resides in Shanghai.

Discography 

2002: ... The Rest Is Rumours (Curling Legs), with Pål Thowsen, Jon Eberson
2003: Live In Getxo (Hilargi Records), with Solid!
2004: Ignition (AIM Records), with Jupiter
2006: Live At Glenn Miller Café (AIM Records), with Jupiter feat. Jonas Kullhammar
2007: III2 (AIM Records), with Jupiter feat. Jonas Kullhammar
2007: Mise En Bouteille À New York (Calibrated Records), Nickelsen Trio including Lage Lund, Ari Hoenig
2007: Excess Luggage (Park Grammofon), Nickelsen / Storaas / Mjåset Johansen
2007: Selected Recordings ( Records), with Peloton
2009: Corrupted Mirror ( Records), Nickelsen, Strømme, Nylander
2011: Hand Luggage Only ( Records), with Excess Luggage
2011: The Early Years ( Records), with Peloton
2012: Dear You (Paralell Records), with Monkeybar duo including Erik Nylander

References

External links 

Bjørn Vidar Solli, Steinar Nickelsen, Nicholas McBride live at EastShore jazz club, Beijing on YouTube

Norwegian jazz musicians
Norwegian organists
Male organists
Norwegian Academy of Music alumni
Norwegian University of Science and Technology alumni
Musicians from Oslo
1978 births
Living people
21st-century organists
21st-century Norwegian male musicians
Male jazz musicians
TINGeLING members